Radio Beijing International (literally Beijing Foreign Language Broadcast) is a radio station which broadcasts on FM92.3 AM774.  The radio station is part of the Radio Beijing Corporation.

There are many languages represented on this radio station including Japanese and English with the commercials, announcements and station identification done in Mandarin Chinese.

External links
 Official Website

Mandarin-language radio stations
Radio stations in China
Mass media in Beijing